Jamie W. Spowart (born 15 May 1998) is a New Zealand rugby union player. His position of choice is Wing.

Tasman 
In August 2019 he was named in the 2019 Tasman Mako squad for the first time. He was vice captain of the Mako squad that toured the United States of America in January 2020. He was named in the 2020 Tasman Mako squad but did not play a game as the Mako won their second premiership title in a row.

Southland 
After not being named in the Tasman squad for the 2021 Bunnings NPC Spowart headed north and was part of the  wider training squad before being named to come off the bench for  against  in Round 1 of the competition.

References

External links
itsrugby.co.uk profile

New Zealand rugby union players
1998 births
Living people
Tasman rugby union players
Southland rugby union players
Rugby union wings
Rugby union fullbacks